The Proceedings of the Royal Irish Academy (PRIA) is the journal of the Royal Irish Academy, founded in 1785 to promote the study of science, polite literature, and antiquities. It was known as several titles over the years:
1836-1866: Proceedings of the Royal Irish Academy
1870-1884: Proceedings of the Royal Irish Academy. Science
1879: Proceedings of the Royal Irish Academy. Polite Literature and Antiquities
1889-1901: Proceedings of the Royal Irish Academy

In 1902, the journal split into three sections Section A: Mathematical and Physical Sciences, Section B: Biological, Geological, and Chemical Science and Section C: Archaeology, Culture, History, Literature. Section A is now published as Mathematical Proceedings of the Royal Irish Academy since 1998, and Section B is now published as Biology and Environment: Proceedings of the Royal Irish Academy. Section C is now Proceedings of the Royal Irish Academy: Archaeology, Culture, History, Literature.

References

External links
 

Magazines published in Ireland
Royal Irish Academy
Multidisciplinary academic journals